The 2019 NCAA Division I softball tournament was held from May 31 to June 4, 2019, as the final part of the 2019 NCAA Division I softball season. Thirty-two teams were awarded automatic bids as champions of their conferences, and the remaining 32 were selected at-large by the NCAA Division I softball selection committee. The 64-team, double-elimination tournament concluded with the 2019 Women's College World Series at ASA Hall of Fame Stadium in Oklahoma City. The UCLA Bruins won their 13th championship, defeating the Oklahoma Sooners in two games.

Bids

Automatic bids
The Big West, Mountain West, Pac-12, and West Coast Conference bids were awarded to the regular-season champion. All other conferences have the automatic bid go to the conference tournament winner.

At-large

By conference

National seeds
16 National Seeds were announced on the Selection Show, on Sunday, May 12 at 9 p.m. EDT on ESPN2. The 16 national seeds host the Regionals. Teams in italics advanced to Super Regionals. Teams in bold advance to Women's College World Series.

1.  (49–2)

2. UCLA (46–5)

3.  (45–7)

4.  (51–8)

5.  (44–15)

6.  (42–12)

7.  (41–12)

8. Alabama (52–7)

9.  (41–14)

10.  (40–16)

11. Ole Miss (37–17)

12.  (39–14)

13.  (39–14)

14.  (33–22)

15.  (43–11)

16.  (43–10)

Regionals and Super Regionals
The Regionals were held May 16–20, 2019. The Super Regionals were held May 23–26, 2019.

Norman Super Regional

Tuscaloosa Super Regional

Gainesville Super Regional

Tallahassee Super Regional

Seattle Super Regional

Tucson Super Regional

Minneapolis Super Regional

Los Angeles Super Regional

Women's College World Series
The Women's College World Series was held May 30 through June 4, 2019, in Oklahoma City.

Participants 

† = From NCAA Division I Softball Championship Results

Bracket

All-tournament Team
The following players were members of the Women's College World Series All-Tournament Team.

Championship game

Game results

Record by conference

The columns RF, SR, WS, NS, F, and NC respectively stand for the Regional Finals, Super Regionals, College World Series Teams, National Semi-Finals, Finals, and National Champion.

Media coverage

Radio
Westwood One provided nationwide radio coverage of the championship series. It was streamed online at westwoodsports.com, through TuneIn, and on SiriusXM. Ryan Radtke made his softball radio debut and joined returning analyst Leah Amico.

Television
ESPN held exclusive rights to the tournament. The network aired games across ESPN, ESPN2, ESPNU,  SEC Network, and ESPN3. For just the third time in the history of the women's softball tournament, ESPN covered every regional.

Broadcast assignments

Regionals
Norman: Pam Ward & Jenny Dalton-Hill
Evanston: Kevin Fitzgerald & Jennie Ritter
Austin: Alex Loeb & Megan Willis
Tuscaloosa: Tiffany Greene & Kayla Braud
Gainesville: Eric Frede & Madison Shipman
Knoxville: Jenn Hildreth & Carol Bruggeman]
Stillwater: Melissa Lee & Cheri Kempf
Tallahassee: Mike Couzens & Erin Miller
Super Regionals
Norman: Tiffany Greene & Kayla Braud
Tuscaloosa: Beth Mowins, Jessica Mendoza, & Michele Smith
Gainesville: Eric Frede & Madison Shipman
Tallahassee: Courtney Lyle & Amanda Scarborough
Women's College World Series
Adam Amin, Amanda Scarborough, & Tiffany Greene (afternoons, early Fri)
Beth Mowins, Jessica Mendoza (Thurs, Fri, Championship series), Michele Smith, & Holly Rowe (evenings minus early Fri)

Regionals
Seattle: Alex Perlman & Kenzie Fowler
Lexington: Dave Baker & Francesca Enea
Oxford: Seth Austin & Missy Dickerson
Tucson: Beth Mowins & Michele Smith
Minneapolis: Courtney Lyle & Amanda Scarborough
Baton Rouge: Matt Schumacker & Leigh Dakich
Ann Arbor: Mark Neely & Danielle Lawrie
Los Angeles: Trey Bender & Leah Amico
Super Regionals
Seattle: Mark Neely, Danielle Lawrie, & Holly Rowe
Tucson: Mike Couzens & Erin Miller
Minneapolis: Jenn Hildreth & Carol Bruggeman
Los Angeles: Pam Ward & Jenny Dalton-Hill 
Women's College World Series Finals
Beth Mowins, Jessica Mendoza, Michele Smith, & Holly Rowe (TV)
Adam Amin, Amanda Scarborough, Kayla Braud, & Tiffany Greene (ESPN3 Second Screen Experience)

References

NCAA Division I softball tournament
Tournament
NCAA
NCAA
NCAA
NCAA
NCAA
NCAA
NCAA
NCAA
NCAA
NCAA
NCAA
NCAA
NCAA
NCAA